Scopula laevipennis is a moth of the family Geometridae. It was described by Warren in 1897. It is found in Cameroon, the Democratic Republic of Congo, Equatorial Guinea, Gabon, Kenya, Sierra Leone, Uganda and Zambia.

References

Moths described in 1897
laevipennis
Moths of Africa
Taxa named by William Warren (entomologist)